Sarah Ssali, is a Ugandan social scientist, researcher, academic and academic administrator, who is an Associate Professor and Dean of the School of Gender Studies at Makerere University, Uganda's oldest and largest public university.

Background and education
Ssali was born in the Buganda Region of Uganda. After attending local primary and secondary schools, she was admitted to Makerere University, in Uganda's capital, Kampala. She graduated in 1992, with a Bachelor of Arts in Social Sciences.

She went on to obtain a Master of Arts degree in Gender Studies at Makerere University in 1999. Later, she received a Doctor of Philosophy in International Health Studies from Queen Margaret University, in Edinburgh, Scotland.

Career
Ssali is an experienced social scientist with a long track record in the field stretching back to the late 1990s. Her areas of interest include HIV/AIDS, Gender, Reproductive Health, Health Systems, Public Policy and Politics. Much of Ssali's research focuses on hidden and non-heteronormative behaviors as well as minority groups. Her research has focused on her native country Uganda, but often involves other African countries and distant continents, including Europe and North America.

Family
Professor Sarah Ssali is a married mother.

Board and Committee Membership

 World Bank's Systematic Country Diagnostic (SCD) Advisory Task Force (UG)
 Mengo Hospital Research Review Committee
 The National Bio-Safety Committee of the Uganda National Council of Science and Technology
 International Association for Feminist Economics
 Makerere University Council
 Makerere University Appointments Board
 Makerere University Quality Assurance Committee
 Makerere University Students’ Welfare and Disciplinary Committee (Chair)
 South Africa Sociological Association (SASA)
 Uganda British Alumni Association (UBAA)

On the Makerere University Council, Ssali represents the Academic Staff. She is also a member of the ReBUILD Research Consortium, based at Queen Mary University in Edinburgh, Scotland.

Professor Ssali is a member of the Advisory Board of "The Next Generation Social Sciences in Africa Program", a collaborative effort among social scientists in research and academia in Africa and the United States.

See also
 Stella Nyanzi
 Sylvia Tamale
 Zahara Nampewo

References

External links
Academic Profile

Living people
1971 births
Ugandan women academics
Ganda people
HIV/AIDS researchers
Makerere University alumni
Academic staff of Makerere University
Alumni of Queen Margaret University
People from Central Region, Uganda